Neil Robert Parsley (born 25 April 1966 in Liverpool) is a former professional footballer who played as a defender for Witton Albion, Leeds United, Chester City, Huddersfield Town, Doncaster Rovers, West Bromwich Albion and Exeter City. He moved to Albion for £25,000 in September 1993, and went on to make 48 appearances for the club.

He was appointed as caretaker manager of Farsley Celtic on 3 October 2008, following the sacking of John Deacey. He was given the role permanently on 28 October.

In March 2010, Farsley Celtic A.F.C. were disbanded after failing to come out of administration. At the end of May, Parsley agreed to become the manager of the team that was formed to replace them, Farsley Celtic F.C. He left the club in May 2017 despite leading the club to promotion to the Premier Division of the Northern Premier League in 2016–17.

References

External links

1966 births
Living people
English footballers
Association football fullbacks
Witton Albion F.C. players
Leeds United F.C. players
Chester City F.C. players
Huddersfield Town A.F.C. players
Doncaster Rovers F.C. players
West Bromwich Albion F.C. players
Exeter City F.C. players
Guiseley A.F.C. players
English Football League players
English football managers
Guiseley A.F.C. managers
Farsley Celtic F.C. managers
Footballers from Liverpool